Stenoscaptia latifascia is a moth in the family Erebidae. It is found on Volcan Island.

References

Natural History Museum Lepidoptera generic names catalog

Lithosiini
Moths described in 1916